A Mornay sauce is a béchamel sauce with shredded or grated cheese added.  Some variations use different combinations of Gruyère, Emmental cheese, white cheddar or even Parmesan cheese. A Mornay sauce made with cheddar is commonly used to make macaroni and cheese.

Etymology
The name origin of Mornay sauce is debated. It may be named after Philippe, duc de Mornay (1549–1623), Governor of Saumur and seigneur du Plessis-Marly, writer and diplomat, but a cheese sauce during this time would have to have been based on a velouté sauce because béchamel had not yet been developed.

Sauce Mornay does not appear in Le cuisinier Royal, 10th edition, 1820, perhaps because sauce Mornay is not older than the seminal Parisian restaurant Le Grand Véfour, where sauce Mornay was introduced.

In the Tout-Paris of Charles X, the Mornay name was represented by two stylish men, the marquis de Mornay and his brother, styled comte Charles. They figure in Lady Blessington's memoir of a stay in Paris in 1828–29, The Idler in France. They might also be considered, when an eponym is sought for sauce Mornay.

See also

 Cheese sauce
 Croque-monsieur
 French mother sauces
 Welsh rarebit
 List of sauces

References

External links

White sauces
Cheese dishes
French sauces